John Christopher McGinley (born August 3, 1959) is an American actor. His best known roles include Perry Cox in Scrubs, Bob Slydell in Office Space, Captain Hendrix in The Rock, Sergeant Red O'Neill in Oliver Stone's Platoon, Marv in Stone's Wall Street, FBI agent Ben Harp in Point Break, and the serial killer Edgler Foreman Vess in the TV miniseries of Intensity, based on the novel by Dean Koontz. He has written and produced for television and film. Apart from acting, McGinley is an author, a board member and international spokesman for the Global Down Syndrome Foundation, and a spokesman for the National Down Syndrome Society.

Early life
McGinley, who is one of five children, was born in the Greenwich Village section of New York City, the son of a schoolteacher and a stockbroker. His paternal great-grandfather was from Donegal, Ireland. McGinley was raised in Millburn, New Jersey, and attended Millburn High School, where he played wide receiver for the school's football team. He studied acting at Syracuse University, and later at New York University's Graduate Acting Program at the Tisch School of the Arts, graduating in 1984. Upon completing his education, McGinley did a variety of different work, including Off Broadway and Broadway productions, and a two-year stint on the soap opera Another World.

Career
McGinley has had a prolific career, primarily as a supporting character actor. He was noticed by a casting scout while working as John Turturro's understudy in John Patrick Shanley's 1984 production of Danny and the Deep Blue Sea, which led to a successful audition for the role of Sergeant Red O'Neill in the Oscar-winning Platoon (1986). McGinley had been cast in his first film role in Alan Alda's Sweet Liberty earlier in 1986. That was followed the next year with Wall Street (1987), and again the next with Talk Radio (1988). He was featured in a 1980s Subaru commercial. He appeared in the "Celebrity Challenge" version of American Gladiators, losing to Dean Cain. McGinley wrote the script for, and co-starred in, the 1990 film Suffering Bastards.

He worked continually throughout the 1990s, appearing in films such as Point Break (1991), Highlander II: The Quickening (1991), Article 99 (1992), Wagons East (1994), Seven (1995), The Rock (1996), Set It Off (1996), Nothing to Lose (1997) and Office Space (1999) (McGinley improvised several takes about his character's fondness for Michael Bolton). In 2007, he had a role as Chuck in the film Are We Done Yet? He had a small role as a gay highway patrolman in the film Wild Hogs which co-stars his Article 99 co-star Ray Liotta, although they don't share any screen credit.

McGinley has done voice-over work on animated television series, including the superhero The Atom on several episodes of Justice League Unlimited, a guest appearance as "The White Shadow", the secret government agent overseeing Huey Freeman on The Boondocks, voicing The Whammer on the PBS Kids Go! series WordGirl as well as the lead character in the Sony PSP video game Dead Head Fred.

McGinley received critical acclaim for his performance as a serial killer in Dean Koontz's suspense drama Intensity (1997). It became Fox Television's highest-rated miniseries. He worked with Koontz and Fox once more in Sole Survivor (2000).

In 2001, McGinley began work as a regular on the NBC television series Scrubs as the acerbic Dr. Perry Cox. Throughout the series Dr. Cox acts as an unwilling mentor to the protagonist J.D. (Zach Braff). McGinley has said that there are three things over the course of the series that he improvises: his constant usage of girls' names for JD, which he does with all his real friends; his whistle, which he describes as "a bad habit"; and his habit of touching his nose, a tribute to Robert Redford's character in The Sting, and which he says means "It's gonna be OK."

Since the NFL season of 2007, McGinley has played the "Commish" of the More Taste League commercials for Miller Lite. He has done commercials for the Champions Tour, a professional golf tour for men over the age of 50. In 2008, McGinley was the narrator of the documentary of the 2008 Stanley Cup Championship of the Detroit Red Wings. In 2009, McGinley started narrating commercials for ESPN.com.

McGinley wrote a 2005 book titled Untalkative Bunny: How to be Heard Without Saying a Word, which featured the title character from the show Untalkative Bunny on its cover.

In 2008, McGinley was named an Honorary Patron of the University Philosophical Society, Trinity College, Dublin.

In 2009, he was cast in the film adaptation of the comic book Superman/Batman: Public Enemies, and he plays the role of the classic Superman villain, Metallo.

In 2012, it was announced that McGinley would be a recurring character on USA Network's Burn Notice as Michael Westen's original CIA trainer, Tom Card. He was first introduced in the second episode of the show's sixth season. In the same year, he appeared in a State Farm insurance commercial as a father wanting his college graduate son to move out.

He began 2013 in the Broadway revival of Glengarry Glen Ross as Dave Moss. "It was the best couple of months of my life," he said. In the same year, it was announced that TBS made a series order for the television series Ground Floor, which stars McGinley. The series was canceled in 2015 after two seasons. In October 2014, McGinley hosted The E Street Radio channel on Sirius XM20 radio, discussing his appreciation of Bruce Springsteen's music, and their shared New Jersey roots.
From 2016 to 2018, he starred in the horror/comedy television series,  Stan Against Evil on IFC. McGinley played a crusty retired sheriff who reluctantly helps his perky replacement fight the demons that have taken over their small town. (IMDb: : Stan Against Evil 
https://www.imdb.com/title/tt5722214/)

Personal life
In February 1997, McGinley married Lauren Lambert. Their son, Max, who has Down syndrome, was born that year. In December 2001, Lambert and McGinley divorced. In October 2002, he was chosen as "Dad of the Month" at iParenting.com. In August 2006, McGinley became engaged to yoga instructor Nichole Kessler in Malibu, whom he had dated for two years. The couple married on April 7, 2007, in a private ceremony at their home. They have two daughters.

McGinley owns a stake in one of Billy Gilroy's New York SoHo bistros, along with fellow actor Willem Dafoe.

McGinley serves on the board of the Global Down Syndrome Foundation, based in Denver. He is a celebrity Ambassador for the National Down Syndrome Society. In addition, he is a Global Ambassador for Special Olympics and was an integral part in crafting its "R-word: Spread The Word, To End The Word" campaign. McGinley is a vocal supporter for the special needs community, and commented in late 2011 on the experience of raising a teenager with Down syndrome along with two young daughters:

McGinley is an avid fan of the NHL Detroit Red Wings, and shows this by wearing a Red Wings jersey (usually Chris Chelios) in several Scrubs episodes. He was the narrator of the 2008 Championship DVD of the Red Wings. He maintains a home in Malibu, California, and is well known as a member of the "Malibu Mob", a group of celebrity friends and neighbors including John Cusack, Tony Danza, former Detroit Red Wings defenseman Chris Chelios, big-wave surfer Laird Hamilton, beach volleyball pro Gabrielle Reece, and tennis player John McEnroe. McGinley enjoys going golfing with John Cusack in his free time, and is a member of the Sherwood Lake Club.

Filmography

Film

Television

Awards and nominations

References

External links

 
 
  

1959 births
Male actors from New Jersey
Male actors from New York City
American male film actors
American film producers
American male stage actors
American male television actors
American male voice actors
American people of Irish descent
Living people
Millburn High School alumni
People from Greenwich Village
People from Millburn, New Jersey
Syracuse University College of Visual and Performing Arts alumni
Circle in the Square Theatre School alumni
Tisch School of the Arts alumni
20th-century American male actors
21st-century American male actors
American Gladiators contestants